Sir Ronald Graeme Millar (12 November 1919 – 16 April 1998) was an English actor, scriptwriter, and dramatist.

Life and career
After attending Charterhouse School, Millar studied at King's College, Cambridge for a year before joining the Royal Navy in 1940, during the Second World War. He established himself as a playwright after the war and, between 1948 and 1954, lived in Hollywood, where he wrote scripts for MGM. These included The Miniver Story and Scaramouche, both with George Froeschel.

On his return to Britain, he successfully adapted several C. P. Snow novelsand, in 1967, William Clark's novel Number 10for the stage. He also wrote the book and lyrics for the musical Robert and Elizabeth.

Millar acted as speechwriter for three British prime ministers, including Margaret Thatcher for whom he wrote the line "The lady's not for turning". He was knighted after Thatcher became Prime Minister in 1979. He wrote the line, Where there is discord, let us bring harmony, which was one of her promises on arrival at 10 Downing Street.

Millar was the son of a professional actress, Dorothy Dacre-Hill. Prior to becoming a full-time dramatist and then a speechwriter, he acted in a number of West End productions during and after World War II, in the company of luminaries as Ivor Novello, Alastair Sim and John Gielgud. He also appeared in the 1943 war film We Dive at Dawn directed by Anthony Asquith. One of his most well-received productions was Abelard and Heloise featuring Keith Michell and Diana Rigg.

Selected filmography
 Frieda (1947)
 So Evil My Love (1948)
 Train of Events (1949)
 The Miniver Story (1950)
 The Unknown Man (1951)
 Scaramouche (1952)
 Never Let Me Go (1953)
 Rose Marie (1954)
 Betrayed (1954)

Selected plays
 Frieda (1946)
 Waiting for Gillian (1954)
 The Bride and the Bachelor (1956)
 The Big Tickle (1958)

References

External links
 
 

1919 births
1998 deaths
20th-century English dramatists and playwrights
20th-century English male actors
20th-century English male writers
20th-century English novelists
20th-century British screenwriters
British male dramatists and playwrights
English male novelists
English male stage actors
English gay actors
English gay writers
English LGBT novelists
British LGBT screenwriters
British male screenwriters
Royal Navy personnel of World War II
20th-century English LGBT people